The Boston University Police Department (BUPD) is the primary law-enforcement agency of Boston University and provides services to more than 41,000 students, faculty, and staff on  of University property and surrounding streets. Its headquarters are located on Harry Agganis Way adjacent to Nickerson Field, in what was once the Braves Field ticket office.

History 

The BUPD was created through an act of legislation in October 1947.

In 2005 a former deputy chief sued the university after being laid off by Chief Robert T. Shea (in 2002).  A Massachusetts Superior Court judge dismissed the case but wrote that the plaintiff “reasonably … believed that BU and Shea were engaged in wrongful discrimination.”

In 2006, Boston University hired the superintendent of the Massachusetts State Police, Thomas G. Robbins, as Chief of BUPD and Executive Director of Public Safety.

Organization 

The department employs 50 sworn personnel and a complement of 10 civilian support staff. Specialized units include a Detective Bureau, a Mountain Bike Unit, a Training and Development Unit, and Community Oriented Policing Services. The department provides services to 33,000 Boston University students; 9,300 faculty and staff members; and campus visitors.

Authority 

All BUPD police are sworn “special State Police officers” and have full arrest authority on Boston University property and adjoining streets. The authority of the BUPD is derived from chapter 22C, section 63 of the General Laws of Massachusetts.

Additionally, all Boston University Police Officers hold commissions as deputy sheriffs in Suffolk, Middlesex, and Norfolk Counties, giving them arrest powers throughout Boston, Cambridge, and Brookline, where BU has facilities.

See also
Campus police

References

External links 
 

Boston University
University and college police forces of the United States
School police departments of Massachusetts